The Other Side of Life is the twelfth studio album by English progressive rock band the Moody Blues, released in 1986 by Polydor Records.

This was the first Moody Blues album since 1978's Octave, and only the second since 1969's On the Threshold of a Dream, not to be released by the Moodies' custom label, Threshold Records.  Beginning with this album, and continuing through 1999's Strange Times, albums would be branded "in association with Threshold Records".

Production
The Other Side of Life was the third recording with Swiss keyboardist Patrick Moraz and the first for flutist and vocalist Ray Thomas not to play a major role. The main songwriters were vocalist/guitarist Justin Hayward and bassist John Lodge, with only one song, "The Spirit", composed by Moraz (his only songwriting credit with the band) and drummer Graeme Edge. The music on the album is characterized by the heavy use of synthesizers, sequencers and drum machines, to the point that it could be classified as synth-pop, a sharp change in style for a band that had stood at the origins of symphonic rock.

The album was recorded at Good Earth Studios in London and produced by Tony Visconti.

Reception
Anthony DeCurtis in his review for Rolling Stone suggested that the album for the most part "plays to the Moodys' longstanding musical strengths: luscious symphonic textures, rich, stately melodies and densely overlaid vocal arrangements" and praised the band for successfully avoiding pompous lyrics, which he felt were present only on "The Spirit".

Track listing

Personnel

The Moody Blues
 Justin Hayward – vocals, guitar
 John Lodge – vocals, bass
 Ray Thomas – tambourine, backing vocals, flute 
 Graeme Edge – drums, percussion 
 Patrick Moraz – keyboards, synthesizers

Technical personnel
 Tony Visconti – producer, engineer
 Alwyn Clayden – art direction, design
 Bruce Gill – design
 Michael Hoppen – photography
 Karl Lloyd – illustration

Charts

Certifications

References

The Moody Blues albums
1986 albums
Polydor Records albums
Albums produced by Tony Visconti